Jonas Totoraitis (24 December 1872 – 21 June 1941) was a Roman Catholic priest and historian.

Education 
Totoraitis studied at the Theological Seminary of Sejny. He went on to Freiburg University in Switzerland, where he published his doctoral dissertation on the life of King Mindaugas, Die Litauer unter dem König Mindowe bis zum Jahre 1263, the first such work by a Lithuanian scholar.

Work 
After returning to Lithuania he continued his historical researches and pastoral work, directed the Marian gymnasium in Marijampolė, and taught at Vytautas Magnus University.

References

1872 births
1941 deaths
20th-century Lithuanian historians
19th-century Lithuanian Roman Catholic priests
20th-century Lithuanian Roman Catholic priests
University of Freiburg alumni
Academic staff of Vytautas Magnus University